Beautiful Night may refer to:

 Burden Brothers (EP), also known as the Beautiful Night EP
 "Beautiful Night" (Paul McCartney song), 1997
 "Beautiful Night" (Beverley Knight song), 2009